Eurycea neotenes, also known as the Texas salamander, Bexar County salamander, Edwards Plateau salamander, or Texas neotenic salamander, is a species of entirely aquatic, lungless salamander native to the United States. It is endemic to central Texas, near Helotes, in Bexar County.

Description 
It is brown in color, often with yellow or brown mottling, with light-yellow spotting down its back. It is neotenic, with a slender body, short limbs, and bright-red external gills. The Texas salamander lives in caves, which resulted in reduced vision in its eyes, due to the long period of time in darkness. It is akin to the Texas blind salamander Eurycea rathbuni.

References 

  (2000): Phylogenetic relationships of central Texas hemidactyliine plethodontid salamanders, genus Eurycea, and a taxonomic revision of the group. Herpetological Monographs 14: 1-80.
  (2001): A new species of subterranean blind salamander (Plethodontidae: Hemidactyliini: Eurycea: Typhlomolge) from Austin, Texas, and a systematic revision of central Texas paedomorphic salamanders. Herpetologica 57: 266–280.
Herps of Texas: Eurycea neotenes
IUCN Red List: Eurycea neotenes

neotenes
Blind animals
Endemic fauna of Texas
Cave salamanders
Amphibians of the United States
Amphibians described in 1937